The stone-ender is a unique style of Rhode Island architecture that developed in the 17th century where one wall in a house is made up of a large stone chimney.

History
Rhode Island was first settled in 1636 by Roger Williams and other colonists from England.  Many of the colonists came from western England and brought the prevalent British architectural ideas with them to New England, but adapted these to the environment of Rhode Island.  The colonists built “stone enders” which made use of the material that was in abundance in the area: timber and stone.  Rhode Island also had an abundance of limestone (in contrast to the other New England states), and this allowed Rhode Islanders to make mortar to build massive end chimneys on their houses. Much of the lime was quarried at Limerock in Lincoln, Rhode Island. Only a few stone enders remain in the 21st century.  Architectural restorationist Norman Isham restored several original stone enders in the early 20th century (see Clement Weaver House and Clemence-Irons House).  Scituate sculptor Armand LaMontagne hand built a large 17th-century style stone-ender off of Route 6 in Scituate, Rhode Island in the 1970s.

Description
Stone ender houses were usually timber-framed, one and one-half or two stories in height, with one room on each floor. One end of the house contained a massive stone chimney which usually filled the entire end wall, thus giving the dwelling the name of “stone ender.” Robert O. Jones noted that the windows were very small “casements filled with oiled paper” and that “the stairs to the upper chambers were steep, ladder-like structures usually squeezed in between the chimney and the front entrance.” He points out that a few houses may have had leaded glass windows, but that was very rare. (For an example containing the leaded glass windows along with ladder-like, steep stairs, see Clement Weaver House, East Greenwich, Rhode Island 1679.)

List of early extant Rhode Island stone-enders 

 Clemence-Irons House, Johnston, Rhode Island, 1691
 Clement Weaver House, East Greenwich, Rhode Island, 1679
 Edward Searle House, Cranston, Rhode Island, 1670–1720
 Eleazer Arnold House, Lincoln, Rhode Island, 1693
 John Bliss House, Newport, Rhode Island 
 John Tripp House, Providence/Newport, Rhode Island, 1720
 Joseph Smith House, North Providence, 1705
 Smith-Appleby House, Smithfield, Rhode Island, 1696 (chimney later modified)
 Thomas Fenner House, Cranston, Rhode Island, 1677
 Valentine Whitman House, Lincoln, Rhode Island, 1694
 Greene-Bowen House, Warwick, Rhode Island

Gallery

See also
 List of the oldest buildings in Rhode Island

References

Further reading 
 Isham, Norman A., and Alber Frederic Brown (1895). Early Rhode Island Houses: An Historical and Architectural Study. Providence: Preston & Rounds.
 Nebiker, Walter (1976). The History of North Smithfield. Somersworth, NH: New England History Press.

External links
 Clement Weaver House—1679
 Warwick Site
 Clemence Irons House (1691)
 Arnold House (1693)

 
Colonial architecture in Rhode Island